The Bradford Farm Historic District encompasses a historic farm property in Patten, Maine.  Located on the west side of Maine State Route 11 on the north side of the village center, it includes a nearly-intact farm complex, with buildings dating from the 1840s to the 20th century.  The property was listed on the National Register of Historic Places in 2003.  The farmhouse is now the Bradford House Bed and Breakfast.

Description and history
The town of Patten is located in the remote interior of Maine, in northern Penobscot County.  The Bradford Farm complex occupies about  just north of the village center.  The main complex is located on the west side of Maine State Route 11, the main north-south route through the county, and the associated farmlands extend west and north to Maine State Route 159, which provides access to the northern end of Baxter State Park.  The main feature of the farm complex is its 19th-century connected farmstead, which includes a c. 1845 Greek Revival house, connected via ells to a barn complex, whose oldest element is an English barn of similar vintage.  Other buildings include a 19th-century potato house and wagon shed.

The township that became Patten was first settled in the 1830s, and Patten was incorporated in 1841. The property was purchased in 1893 by Ezekiel Bradford, whose family worked the land for 105 years. The Bradfords operated the property primarily as a dairy farm, adding and extending buildings to meet a variety of needs. In 1998 the farmhouse was converted into a bed and breakfast inn.

See also
National Register of Historic Places listings in Penobscot County, Maine

References

External links
The Bradford House web site

Historic districts on the National Register of Historic Places in Maine
Greek Revival architecture in Maine
Victorian architecture in Maine
Buildings and structures completed in 1842
Buildings and structures in Penobscot County, Maine
National Register of Historic Places in Penobscot County, Maine
Farms on the National Register of Historic Places in Maine